The Le Mars Community School District, or Le Mars Community Schools, is a rural public school district headquartered in Le Mars, Iowa.  The school district, entirely in Plymouth County, provides education for students living in Le Mars, Brunsville, Craig, Merrill, and Struble, in addition to the surrounding rural areas.
The mascot is the Bulldogs and their colors are red and black.

Schools
The district operates six schools, all located in Le Mars:
Clark Elementary School
Franklin Elementary School
Kluckhohn Elementary School
Individualized Learning Center
Le Mars Middle School
Le Mars High School

Le Mars High School

Athletics
The Bulldogs compete in the Missouri River Conference in the following sports:

Baseball 
Basketball 
Bowling
Cross Country 
Football
1973 Class 3A State Champions
Golf 
Soccer 
Softball 
Swimming 
Tennis 
Track and Field 
Volleyball 
Wrestling
Dance Team

See also
 List of school districts in Iowa
 List of high schools in Iowa

References

External links
 Le Mars Community School District

School districts in Iowa
Education in Plymouth County, Iowa